Joliet or Jolliet may refer to:

People
 Louis Jolliet (1645–1700), French-Canadian explorer of North America
 Oscar Joliet (1878–1969), Belgian scholar-priest and Catholic Auxiliary bishop of Ghent

Places in the United States
 Joliet, Illinois, a city named after Louis Jolliet, seat of Will County
 Joliet Correctional Center, a prison in the city
 Joliet Township, Will County, Illinois
 Joliet, Montana, a town
 Joliet Township, Platte County, Nebraska
 Joliet, Texas, an unincorporated community

Schools
 Joliet Junior College, Joliet, Illinois, a public community college
 Joliet Central High School, Joliet, Illinois
 Joliet Catholic Academy, a coed Catholic high school in Joliet, Illinois

Other uses
 Joliet Chargers, a former football franchise based in Joliet, Illinois
 Joliet Slammers, a baseball team in based Joliet, Illinois
 Joliet Army Ammunition Plant, Will County, Illinois, a former United States Army arsenal
 Joliet Bridge, near Joliet, Montana, on the National Register of Historic Places
 "Joliet", a song by Andy Prieboy from the album ...Upon My Wicked Son
 "Joliet" Jake Blues (John Belushi), member of the Blues Brothers band
 Joliet (file system), an extension to the ISO 9660 specification, written by Microsoft

See also 
 Juliet (disambiguation)
 Juliette (disambiguation)
 Joliette (disambiguation)